Amari Miquel Miller (born 4 November 2002) is an English professional footballer who plays as a winger for  club Leeds United. A product of Birmingham City's academy, he made his senior debut for the club in the EFL Championship in April 2021, and signed for Leeds in June.

Life and career

Early life and career
Miller was born in Birmingham, where he attended SS Mary and John Primary School and St Edmund Campion Catholic School in the Erdington district. He took up a two-year scholarship with Birmingham City F.C. in July 2019. According to the then academy manager Kristjaan Speakman, Miller "progressed through the Academy as a wide player who can also play in central attacking positions. He is a creative player, able to stay on the ball and dribble with speed and changes of direction. He is an attacking player who is exciting to watch and one the players enjoy playing with due to his flair in possession."

Birmingham City
He played in all four of Birmingham's pre-season friendlies ahead of the 2020–21 season; in the last, he "tucked home a superb cross-field cross from Odin Bailey" for the second goal in a 3–0 win at home to Walsall. Miller continued his development in the club's junior teams before making his first appearance in a senior matchday squad on 10 April 2021. With Scott Hogan and Jon Toral injured, new manager Lee Bowyer named Miller among the substitutes for the Championship match at home to Stoke City. He came on in stoppage time to replace Lukas Jutkiewicz with his side 2–0 ahead to make his Football League debut, and made two more appearances from the bench. After Birmingham avoided relegation, Bowyer used the two remaining matches as an opportunity to look at his fringe players, and Miller started in both. In May 2021, Birmingham confirmed that Miller was one of five second-year scholars to be offered a professional contract.

Leeds United
Amid reported interest from Premier League clubs including Everton, Southampton and Tottenham Hotspur, Miller signed a four-year contract with Leeds United on 28 June 2021. The fee was undisclosed. He played for Leeds U23 in Premier League 2, and on 14 September, made his EFL Trophy debut for Leeds U21 away to Tranmere Rovers, who led 3–0 at half-time. Miller made the score 3–1 after 63 minutes with a confident finish from Archie Gray's through ball, but Tranmere won 4–1.

Career statistics

References

2002 births
Living people
People from Birmingham, West Midlands
English footballers
Association football wingers
Birmingham City F.C. players
Leeds United F.C. players
English Football League players
Black British sportspeople